Above Suspicion is a British crime drama based on the series of Anna Travis novels written by Lynda La Plante. The series stars Kelly Reilly and Ciarán Hinds as the protagonists Anna Travis and James Langton. Four series were broadcast over a total of four years. The first episode was broadcast on 4 January 2009, and the final episode on 28 January 2012. The first three series all aired on consecutive nights; whereas the fourth series a more traditional weekly format.

Plot
Above Suspicion follows the work of D.C. Anna Travis (Kelly Reilly), a rookie detective determined to prove herself in the male-dominated police department by solving a trail of gruesome murders left by an unknown serial killer. Reilly said of the part; "Well, she's not a political character like Jane Tennison, she's not fighting her ground and it's almost like she just doesn't care. She has an insouciance… she wears those skirts and those heels, and while I don't think she uses her femininity or anything like that, she just doesn't hide it. There's a dilemma for the audience, because normally your prejudices would invite you to dismiss a woman like her who seems a bit awkward and wears tight skirts. But she brings something fresh in among those hackneyed male detectives."

Cast
 Kelly Reilly as D.C./D.S./D.I. Anna Travis
 Ciarán Hinds as D.C.I./D.C.S. James Langton
 Shaun Dingwall as D.I./D.C.I. Mike Lewis
 Daniel Catagirone as D.S. Paul Baroilli (Series 1)
 Celyn Jones as D.S. Paul Barolli (Series 2–4)
 Michelle Holmes as D.C. Barbara Maddox
 Amanda Lawrence as D.C. Joan Faulkland
 Nadia Cameron-Blakey as Commander Jane Leigh (Series 1–2)
 Martin Herdman as D.C.I. Elliot Hudson (Series 1)
 Stuart Organ as D.C.I. Bill Morgan (Series 2)
 Ray Fearon as D.C.I./Commander Sam Power (Series 3–4)

Episode list

Series 1 (2009)
Guest cast in this series include Jason Durr as Alan Daniels; Emma Pollard as Melissa Stephens; and Malcolm Storry as John McDowell. The Daily Telegraph described the series as "Lynda La Plante's younger, sassier successor to Prime Suspect."

Series 2 (2010)
Guest cast in this series include Ty Glaser as Louise Pennel; Edward MacLiam as Richard Reynolds; Sylvia Syms as Mrs. Hedges; and Simon Williams as Charles Wickenham. This series was partly based on a true story, known as the Black Dahlia murder. The series was reviewed favourably by The Daily Telegraph, with a request for "more please."

Series 3 (2011)
Guest cast in this series include Robbie Gee as Silas Roach and Andrew Woodall as David Rushton. The first episode opened with 5.495 million viewers on ITV, a 19.5% share, with another 326,000 on ITV HD. It was narrowly beaten by BBC One's new series of Silent Witness which, with 5.877 million viewers, had a 20.9% share of the 9-10pm audience.

Series 4 (2012)
Part of Silent Scream was filmed in Lexham Mews, W8. Joanna Vanderham guest stars as Amanda Delaney.

References

External links

 Above Suspicion at stv.tv
 
 
 
 
 
 
 Above Suspicion Season 1 – Ciarán Hinds' website
 Red Dahlia Season 2 – Ciarán Hinds' website
 Deadly Intent Season 3 – Ciarán Hinds' website

2000s British drama television series
2010s British drama television series
2000s British crime television series
2010s British crime television series
2009 British television series debuts
2012 British television series endings
British crime television series
English-language television shows
ITV television dramas
Television shows based on British novels
Television series produced at Pinewood Studios
Television shows set in London